Life, released in 2001, is the second album by the American Christian pop rock band ZOEgirl.  "With All of My Heart", "Here and Now", "Even If", "Dismissed" and "Plain" were released as singles.

Background
A pre-release disc known as "Highlights From Life" was released for promotional purposes. It featured "With All of My Heart", "Dismissed", "Waiting", "Nick of Time" and "Even If".

Track listing
All the songs from Life were either written or co-written by at least one ZOEgirl member.

Song by song

"With All of My Heart" starts the album with a pumped up pop-worship song. It obtained the #1 position for 3 weeks on the CHR Charts, and featured in the top 5 on AC radio charts.  It was covered by X.ado.

"Even If" is a euro-style dance track.

"Dismissed" is a dance pop/R&B song. The bold lyrics encourage young ladies to end ("dismiss") unhealthy relationships while also, ZOEgirl sings about not giving in to Satan.

"Waiting" is a slow song, and talks about the God waiting for individuals to come to Him.

"R U Sure About That?" consists of a mix of electronic pop and Spanish guitar; Beethoven's "Für Elise" is plucked out. The song talks about guys, girls, and the truth about life. At the end of the song, a Baroque-styled bridge includes a short "radio talk" and a transition to the next track.

"Ordinary Day" is yet another upbeat song.

"Plain", written solely by Kristin Swinford to address "her own intense struggles with self-esteem" is a slow, soft pop song.  The lyrics are similar to Christina Aguilera's "Beautiful", as it reminds the listener that they are a precious treasure, no matter what others say.  However, while ZOEgirl's song features references to God, Christina's does not.  Later, on their final album (Room to Breathe), Kristin writes "Skin Deep" to once again address self-esteem struggles.

"Nick of Time" is an R&B song.

"Forever 17" is a tender song with piano and strings.  The lyrics reflect on the fragility of life, recounting the story of a teenage girl killed by a drunk driver.

"Here and Now" is a pop rock track with electric guitars and drum loops. The lyrics encourage Christians to stand together and live for Jesus with all they have.  This music genre becomes more common in ZOEgirl's later works, including Different Kind of FREE and Room to Breathe.

"The Truth", the final track, is written by Alisa Girard. It is a slowed-down song, reminiscent of "Constantly" from ZOEgirl's debut album. The final section of the song ends at 6:10. After 18 seconds of silence, the hidden track of "ABCs to Salvation" begins at the 6:28 mark, which can be heard.

Personnel 
ZOEgirl
 Chrissy Conway – vocals 
 Alisa Girard – vocals, keyboards (11)
 Kristin Swinford – vocals, Fender Rhodes (7)

Additional musicians
 Tedd T – programming (1, 2, 3, 5-8, 10, 11), arrangements (1, 2, 3, 5-8, 10, 11)
 Joe P – additional programming (1, 10)
 Damon Riley – additional programming (2, 3, 5-8, 11)
 Kene "Ghost" Bell – additional programming (2, 3, 5-8, 11), additional vocal arrangements (9), additional guitars (11)
 Robert "Aurel M" Marvin – all other instruments (4, 9), acoustic piano (4, 9)
 Byron Hagan – acoustic piano (4, 9)
 Lynn Nichols – guitars (1, 2, 3, 5-8, 10, 11)
 Greg Hagan – guitars (4, 9)
 Aaron Featherstone – additional guitars (11)
 The Love Sponge Strings – strings 
 Andy Selby – string arrangements (9)
 ZOEgirl – vocal arrangements (9)
 Honor Tjornhom – guest vocal (3)

Production
 Lynn Nichols – executive producer 
 Tedd T – producer (1, 2, 3, 5-8, 10, 11), recording (1, 2, 3, 5-8, 10, 11), mixing (2, 5)
 Joe P – co-producer (1, 10)
 Aurel M – producer (4, 9), recording (4, 9)
 Jacquire King – additional production (11), mixing (11)
 Chrissy Conway – additional recording (1, 2, 3, 5-8, 10, 11)
 Salvo – mixing (1, 3, 4, 6-10)
 Kene Bell – editing (2, 3, 5-8, 11)
 Damon Riley – editing (2, 3, 5-8, 11)
 Richard Dodd – mastering 
 Christiév Carothers – creative direction
 Jan Cook – art direction 
 BENTO – design 
 Mike Ruiz – photography 
 Daniel Caudill – stylist 
 Robert Ramos – hair stylist 
 Sarah Sullivan – make-up
 Proper Management – management

Reception

Life received generally favourable reviews. JesusfreakHideout said "From funky dance-pop to heart-wrenching songs, it can't really get much better than this". CCM Magazine called the album "a winner".  Life peaked at No. 111 on the Billboard 200, No. 9 on the Billboard Contemporary Christian Charts and No. 2 on the Billboard Heatseeker's Chart. Christianity Today says "Life may well be the best Christian teen pop album released to date."

In Australia, Life was a great success for radio airplay.  Three songs from Life appeared on The Rock Across Australia's Top 100 Songs of 2002 year-end chart.  "With All of My Heart" received the No. 26 position, "Dismissed" received the No. 39 position, and "Here and Now" received the No. 88 position.  The album also allowed ZOEgirl to secure the No. 18 position for The Rock's Top 50 Artists of 2002 chart.

Related products
There are many products related to the Life album:
The Real Life video was released on VHS and DVD.  It featured the music video for "Dismissed", as well as video montages for the songs "I Believe" and "With All of My Heart".  There are also interviews with ZOEgirl.
The remix album Mix of Life was released in 2002, featuring remixes from all songs in Life (except "R U Sure About That", "Forever 17" and "The Truth").  It also featured four remixes from songs on the self-titled album
The single for "Dismissed" was released to retail in 2002.
The original Dance Praise game, released in 2005, featured "Dismissed".  Also, the expansion pack featured "Even If".

References

2001 albums
ZOEgirl albums
Sparrow Records albums